Cacabelos is a village and municipality located in the region of El Bierzo (province of León, Castile and León, Spain). According to the 2020 census (INE), Cacabelos has a population of 4,996 inhabitants. It is well known for its wines.

It is one of Galician speaking councils of Castilla y León.

History
During the Peninsular War, the village, and more especially, its bridge over the river Cua, was in the line of retreat taken by Sir John Moore's British army to A Coruña, and was the site of the Battle of Cacabelos (3 January 1809), a minor battle.

References

Municipalities in El Bierzo
Astures